Abda of Dair-Koni , (also known as Rabban Mar Abda) was a priest and abbot of the Church of the East.

He was born at Kynai also known as Qani (where the apostle Saint Mari was buried) of an immoral woman who exposed her child to the elements. He was subsequently educated by the Christian church and ordained a priest. He founded a monastery and a school at Dair Qoni. In this capacity, he served as the teacher of Mar Abba. After a career in which he successfully converted several Marcionites, he retired to Tella on the Serser River.

No feast day commemorating this saint has been found to have existed.

References

Sources
 Holweck, F. G., "A Biographical Dictionary of the Saints". St. Louis, MO: B. Herder Book Co., 1924.

450s births
Year of birth uncertain
Year of death unknown
Monks of the Church of the East
Assyrian Church of the East saints
Byzantine abbots
Christian saints in unknown century
5th-century Christian saints